Musubu Funaki (船木結) (born May 10, 2002) is a Japanese pop singer. She is a former 6th generation member of Japanese girl group Angerme and a former member of Country Girls.

Biography

Musubu was born on May 10, 2002, in Osaka, Japan. She is an only child.

Overview

In 2013, Funaki participated in Morning Musume's first 12th generation audition and made it to the final round, but was not chosen to join the group.
On December 7, Funaki was officially introduced as a Hello Pro Kenshuusei at the Hello Pro Kenshuusei Happyoukai 2013 ~12gatsu no Nama Tamago Show!~ alongside Risa Yamaki, Yumei Yokogawa, Kisora Niinuma, Hirona Oura, Ruru Danbara and Akane Haga.

On November 5, it was announced at Country Girls' first anniversary event that she would be joining the group alongside Nanami Yanagawa

On June 9, 2017, it was announced that Country Girls would be ceasing regular activities and that three of the members, including Musubu, would be transferring to other Hello! Project groups. On June 26, through a special episode of Hello! Project Station, it was revealed that Musubu would be joining Angerme as a new 6th generation member alongside Ayano Kawamura. She will begin performing with group in the Hello! Project 2017 SUMMER concert tour, while being a concurrent member of Country Girls at the same time.

She retired from the entertainment world in December 2020.

Hello! Project groups and units 
 Hello Pro Kenshuusei (2013–2015)
 Country Girls (2015–2019)
 Angerme (2017–2020)

Discography
for Musubu Funaki's releases with Country Girls and Angerme, see Country Girls (band)#Discography and Angerme#Discography.

Filmography

References

2002 births
Living people
People from Osaka Prefecture
Musicians from Osaka Prefecture
Angerme members
Japanese women pop singers
Japanese female idols